Ana Konjuh (born 27 December 1997) is a Croatian tennis player. 

A successful junior player, Konjuh won both the singles and doubles junior events at the Australian Open in January 2013 and, as a result, moved up to No. 1 in the ITF Junior world rankings. Later in the year, she also won the girls' singles event at the 2013 US Open. She turned her attention to the main tour in 2014, and made her debut in the top 100 aged 16.

Konjuh won her first singles title on the WTA Tour at the 2015 Nottingham Open, becoming the youngest player to win a main tour event since 2006. She has also won one title on the ITF Women's Circuit. On 31 July 2017, she reached her career-high singles ranking of world No. 20.

Tennis career

Junior career
Aged 14, Konjuh was the runner-up at the 2012 Wimbledon Championships in girls' doubles. In December 2012, Konjuh won two prestigious junior tennis tournaments, Eddie Herr and the Orange Bowl.

In January 2013, she won the singles and doubles events at the Australian Open, and became the No. 1 junior in the world. She also received a call up to the Croatia Fed Cup team, where she scored the biggest win of her career, defeating Poland's Urszula Radwańska, ranked No. 37 in the world, at the age of 15.

In September 2013, Konjuh won the singles title at the US Open, her second singles junior Grand Slam. Despite being eligible to continue playing junior tournaments for two more years, Konjuh ceased playing junior events at the end of 2013, changing her focus to competing on the main tour in 2014.

2014: First full tour season and top-100 ranking
Konjuh was awarded a main-draw wildcard for the Auckland Open in New Zealand. On her debut at WTA Tour-level, she stunned the top seed and world No. 14 Roberta Vinci, in the first round in three sets. At the Australian Open, she came through qualifying to reach her first Grand Slam main draw, but lost in the first round to the fourth seed and eventual champion, Li Na.

Konjuh underwent elbow surgery on 23 January in Zagreb. Her recovery lasted four months, and she made her return in May by defeating Allie Kiick at the Open Saint-Gaudens. Konjuh made it to the semifinals of the $50k tournament in France, before losing to the eventual champion Danka Kovinić, in straight sets. This run helped her up to a new world ranking high of No. 189 and enabled her to enter the qualifying draw at Roland Garros, but she again suffered defeat to Kovinić in the second round. She was more successful at Wimbledon, qualifying for the main draw with victories over Estrella Cabeza Candela, Laura Siegemund and Stephanie Vogt. She then earned her first career Grand Slam main-draw win by defeating Marina Erakovic in the first round, and followed it up with the bigger win of her career to date, toppling former world No. 12 Yanina Wickmayer in the second round. Konjuh's run came to an end in the following round with a straight-sets loss to the former world No. 1, Caroline Wozniacki.

Konjuh's good form continued at the Istanbul Cup, where she came through qualifying to reach her first main-draw semifinal, defeating top-40 players Magdaléna Rybáriková and Elina Svitolina en route. Her run came to an end with a defeat to Roberta Vinci. Konjuh suffered disappointment at the US Open when she lost to Urszula Radwańska in the first round of qualifying.

In October, she competed at the Japan Women's Open in Osaka and made the quarterfinals before losing to Zarina Diyas. The result saw her ranking climb to within the top 100 for the first time, aged just 16. She completed her year by competing in three tournaments in France, reaching the semifinals of ITF events in Poitiers and Nantes, and the quarterfinals of the WTA 125 Open de Limoges. This saw Konjuh rise to a new career-high ranking of No. 84, and she completed the season ranked 90, and as the youngest player within the top 100.

2015: First WTA Tour title
Konjuh began the year in Auckland, comfortably defeating Mona Barthel before losing to Elena Vesnina in the second round. She lost in the first round of the Australian Open to Magdaléna Rybáriková. After a string of early losses, she qualified for the main draw of the Prague Open in April, where she defeated the seventh seed, world No. 34 Belinda Bencic, in three sets in the first round. Konjuh then lost in the second round to wildcard Klara Koukalová. Konjuh's indifferent form continued through the clay-court season, but she earned her first main-draw win at the French Open by defeating Margarita Gasparyan, before losing to the 30th seed Irina-Camelia Begu in the second round.

In June, Konjuh competed in the main draw at the inaugural Nottingham Open and reached the quarterfinals with victories over Shelby Rogers and Casey Dellacqua. After being delayed for over two days due to poor weather, Konjuh advanced to the semifinals by defeating Sachia Vickery, and later that day reached her first WTA Tour final by beating Alison Riske. Owing to poor weather, the final was held back to Monday. Konjuh dropped the first set to Monica Niculescu, but recovered to earn victory and her first WTA Tour title. At the age of 17, she was the youngest player to win a main-tour title since Tamira Paszek in 2006.

2016: First Grand Slam quarterfinal
Ranked No. 87 in the world, Konjuh began the season at the Australian Open, where she lost in the second round to Daria Kasatkina, after beating Urszula Radwańska. Except for a quarterfinal appearance at the San Antonio Open, she had early exits at most of her tournaments, including Indian Wells, Miami Open and Madrid Open. At the French Open, Konjuh reached the second round after beating Arina Rodionova in straight sets. She then lost to the No. 22 seed Dominika Cibulková. After a semifinal appearance at the Bol Ladies Open, Konjuh withdrew from the Nottingham Open owing to an injury she sustained at the previous tournament, and fell from the top 100.

After early exits at the Mallorca Open and the Eastbourne International, Konjuh reached the second round of Wimbledon after beating Karin Knapp. She then lost to Agnieszka Radwańska in a three-set thriller in which a late ankle injury halted Konjuh's chances of winning the match. After her campaign, she returned to the top 100. Her next tournament was the Olympics in Rio de Janeiro, where she beat Annika Beck before losing to the world No. 12, Carla Suárez Navarro. Despite losing in the second round of qualifying at the Western & Southern Open, Konjuh qualified for the Connecticut Open where she reached the second round by beating Kayla Day. She then lost to Roberta Vinci in straight sets.

At the US Open, Konjuh upset the 20th seed Kiki Bertens in the first round. She went on to beat Kurumi Nara and Varvara Lepchenko en route to her first major fourth round. She then beat the fourth seed Agnieszka Radwańska in straight sets to become the youngest US Open quarterfinalist in a decade and the first Croatian female quarterfinalist since Karolina Šprem at Wimbledon in 2004. She lost to the tenth seed and eventual finalist Karolína Plíšková in the quarterfinals in straight sets. After the tournament ended, her ranking rose from 92 to 52. After failing in the qualifying round in both the Wuhan Open and the China Open, Konjuh reached semifinals at Guangzhou and quarterfinals at the Kremlin Cup, losing to Jelena Janković and Elina Svitolina, respectively. She ended the year as the world No. 48.

2017: World No. 20
Konjuh started the year at the Auckland Open, where she reached her second WTA tournament final, beating Naomi Osaka and Julia Görges en-route. She then lost in straight sets to Lauren Davis. Despite her loss, Konjuh reached a career-high ranking of world No. 36. At the Australian Open, she beat Kristina Mladenovic in straight sets before losing to Daria Gavrilova.

After losing in the round of 16 of the St. Petersburg Ladies' Trophy to the top seed Simona Halep, Konjuh played at Dubai, where she defeated Zhang Shuai in the first round. She then had back-to-back upsets over the No. 12 seed Samantha Stosur, and the No. 8 seed Elena Vesnina en route to the quarterfinals where she lost to the top seed, Angelique Kerber.

At Wimbledon, she defeated world No. 9, Dominika Cibulková, but lost to the eventual finalist, Venus Williams, in the fourth round. Following this successful run, she achieved a career-high ranking of world No. 20, on 31 July 2017.

In September 2017, Konjuh underwent surgery on her right elbow.

2018-2020: Out of top 500, and later top 1000

2021: Back to top 100
In 2021, at the Miami Open, Konjuh got her first main-draw win after three years as a wildcard. Later, she defeated 18th seeded Madison Keys to reach the third round of the tournament. In the next round, Konjuh recorded her upset against 15th seed Iga Świątek, one of the best performances in her career. In the round of 16, she went down 1-6, 5-7 against Anastasija Sevastova.

At the Serbia Open, Konjuh reached the final in more than four years as a qualifier, defeating second seed Yulia Putintseva in the round of 16, fifth seed Nadia Podoroska in the quarterfinal and teenager María Camila Osorio in the semifinal. She retired due to a right hip injury in the final with Paula Badosa but thanks to another great run, she returned to the top 150, climbing 44 spots in the rankings to No. 144, her best ranking since 2018.

Performance timelines

Only main-draw results in WTA Tour, Grand Slam tournaments, Fed Cup/Billie Jean King Cup and Olympic Games are included in win–loss records.

Singles
Current after the 2023 Merida Open.

Doubles

WTA career finals

Singles: 3 (1 title, 2 runner-ups)

ITF finals

Singles: 6 (4 titles, 2 runner–ups)

Doubles: 1 (runner–up)

Notes

Junior Grand Slam finals

Girls' singles: 2 (2 titles)

Girls' doubles: 2 (1 title, 1 runner–up)

Fed Cup/Billie Jean King Cup participation

Singles (12–6)

Doubles (10–4)

Awards

Head-to-head records

Top 10 wins

Double-bagel matches

References

External links

 
 
  
 
  

1997 births
Living people
Sportspeople from Dubrovnik
Croatian female tennis players
Australian Open (tennis) junior champions
US Open (tennis) junior champions
Grand Slam (tennis) champions in girls' singles
Grand Slam (tennis) champions in girls' doubles
Olympic tennis players of Croatia
Tennis players at the 2016 Summer Olympics
21st-century Croatian women